University Enterprise Zones are specific geographical areas in the United Kingdom where universities engage with Local Enterprise Partnerships to provide business incubator spaces and stimulate economic growth by the application of university backed innovation.

Pilot program
The ten year pilot program for University Enterprise zones was announced by David Cameron in December 2013 "in response to findings in the Witty Review that universities could play a bigger role in enhancing economic growth".

Of the nine applicants, four were funded:
 Sensor_City in Liverpool
 The Digital Health Enterprise Zone in the University of Bradford
 Future Space at the University of the West of England, Bristol
 Ingenuity Centre in University of Nottingham
An interim evaluation of the policy was made in 2017 at a cost of £45k.  The final evaluation is due in 2023.

Second round

In September 2019 UK Government funding was announced for 20 further UEZs:
 Birmingham City University, STEAMincubator
 Cranfield University, AVIATE+
 Keele University, Keele University Corridor University Enterprise Zone
 Lancaster University, Secure Digitalisation University Enterprise Zone
 Oxford Brookes University, Oxford Brookes Artificial Intelligence & Data Analysis Incubator
 Queen Mary University of London, QMUL/Barts Life Sciences University Enterprise Zone
 Sheffield Hallam University, Wellbeing Accelerator
 Staffordshire University, Staffordshire Advanced Materials Incubation and Accelerator Centre
 University of Bristol, Unit DX+
 UCL, East London Inclusive Enterprise Zone
 University of Cambridge, Greater Cambridge Health Tech Connect: Testing and integrating inter-disciplinary models of incubation across West/South Cambridge
 University of Essex, Accelerating Innovation at the Knowledge Gateway
 University of Falmouth, Launchpad
 University of Hertfordshire, The Go Herts University Enterprise Zone
 University of Lincoln, Business Incubation Development to support Food Enterprise Zones
 University of Southampton, Future Towns Innovation Hub
 Durham University, Orbit, in NETPark
 Teesside University, Innovate Tees Valley University Enterprise Zone
 University of Exeter
 University of Sunderland

References

Business incubators of the United Kingdom
Educational organisations based in England
Higher education organisations based in the United Kingdom
Innovation in the United Kingdom
Research and development in the United Kingdom
Universities in England